Thornton Warner (1853–1918) was a Trinidadian cricketer. He played in five first-class matches for Trinidad and Tobago from 1876 to 1895.

See also
 List of Trinidadian representative cricketers

References

External links
 

1853 births
1918 deaths
Trinidad and Tobago cricketers